The MBB Bo 209 Monsun (originally the Bolkow MHK-101) is a two-seat light aircraft that was developed in West Germany in the late 1960s.

Design and development
The Monsun was designed by three Bölkow engineers, led by Bölkow's technical director Dr Hermann Mylius, in their spare time with the intention of creating a more versatile aircraft than the Bölkow Bo 208, with design work beginning in 1965. The new aircraft, designated the MHK-101, was a low-wing monoplane of all-metal construction with a tricycle undercarriage, which had fixed mainwheels, with the option for the nosewheel to be fixed or retractable. While the MHK-101 used some components of the Bo-208, it had a larger and more comfortable cockpit, and an entirely new wing, which could be folded for towing and storage (the Bo 208 was a high-wing aircraft). 

The first prototype MHK-101, powered by a  Lycoming O-235 engine driving a fixed-pitch propeller and with a retractable nosewheel, flew on 22 December 1967. In April 1969, Bölkow selected the MK-101 to replace the Bo 208 in production, with the type becoming the "Bölkow Bo 209 Monson". A second prototype flew in May 1969. That year, Messerschmitt-Bölkow merged with Messerschmitt-Bölkow to become Messerschmitt-Bölkow-Blohm, with the aircraft becoming the MBB Bo 209. The aircraft, which was offered with a variety of engines, a choice of fixed or variable pitch propellers and fixed or retractable nosewheels, entered production at MBB's Laupheim factory early in 1970 and received its type certificate on 9 April 1970. 

With this broad array of equipment options Bölkow displayed the aircraft at the Air Show in Hanover 1970: 57 orders of the new type were drawn in advance and commercial success of the project seemed secured. In March 1972, however, MBB stopped production of the Bo 209 in order to concentrate on the MBB Bo 105 helicopter., after production of 100 Bo 209s in addition to the two prototypes. Rights to the Bo 208 were purchased by Pneuma-Technik E. Ficht who planned to build the Monsun at Weiden, Bavaria, setting up Monson Gmbh in November 1973, but only two aircraft were built before production ended in June 1974. A United States businessman invested in the model, secured funding, and started shipping factory equipment to Georgia. Before completion of the transition, the investor committed suicide after losses in stock market speculation.

In the late 1990s Dr. Mylius's son, Albert Mylius, completed a totally revised version of his father's design under a new company, Mylius Flugzeugwerk GmbH & Co KG, based in Bitburg. Two models were produced: a single seat developed as a low cost aerobatic airplane (My-102), and the two-seat Mylius My-103 Mistral, which has some variations over the original Bo 209 design, like wider cockpit, better handling characteristics and improved overall performance (including aerobatic rating) with a more powerful 200 hp engine.

Variants

 MHK-101 prototype
 Bo 209-125 - proposed production version with  Lycoming O-235 engine. No production.
 Bo 209-150 - production version with  Lycoming O-320-E1C engine.
 Bo 209-160 - production version with  Lycoming IO-320-D1A engine.
 Bo 209S - trainer version with dual controls, non-retracting nosewheel, and non-folding wings, powered by  Rolls-Royce Continental O-240-A.

Specifications (Bo 209-160)

See also

Notes

References

 
 
 
 
 
 
 

1960s German civil utility aircraft
Bo 209
Single-engined tractor aircraft
Low-wing aircraft
Aircraft first flown in 1967